Tebi Rural LLG a local-level government (LLG) of Koroba-Kopiago District in Hela Province, Papua New Guinea.

Wards
01. Tindiparu
02. Itapu
03. Hangapo 1
04. Hangapo 2
05. Andawale 1
06. Kela 1
07. Kela 2
08. Pai 2
09. Parinamu 1
10. Parinamu 2
11. Kuku 1
12. Kuku 2
13. Kuku 3
14. Hewate 1
15. Hewate 2
16. Kuandi 1
17. Kuandi 2
18. Pai 2
19. Andawale 2

References 

Local-level governments of Hela Province